John Cunningham (born 19 February 1974) is a former Australian rules footballer who played for Geelong in the Australian Football League (AFL). He was recruited from the Port Melbourne Football Club in the Victorian Football Association (VFA) with the 9th selection in the 1993 Mid Year Draft, and played two matches for Geelong in 1995.

Cunningham later moved to South Australia and played in 's 1997 South Australian National Football League (SANFL) Premiership side, winning the Jack Oatey Medal as the best player in the grand final.

References

External links

Living people
1974 births
Geelong Football Club players
Port Melbourne Football Club players
Norwood Football Club players
Australian rules footballers from Victoria (Australia)